Hasselt University (Dutch: Universiteit Hasselt or UHasselt) is a public research university with campuses in Hasselt and Diepenbeek, Belgium. It has more than 6,700 students and 1,660 academic, administrative and technical staff (2022). The university was officially established in 1971 as the Limburg Universitair Centrum (LUC) and changed its name to Hasselt University in 2005.

UHasselt is ranked 53rd out of 539 in the 2022 Times Higher Education ranking of universities younger than 50 years. In the European Commission's U-Multirank 2022, UHasselt scores a top ten overall result, with fifteen excellent indicators.

Hasselt University has an extensive regional, national and global network of more than 500 partners, fostering collaboration in education, research and innovation.

As of October 2020, Rector of Hasselt University is Prof. Bernard Vanheusden. Vice-Rector for Education is Prof. Wanda Guedens, Vice-Rector for Research Prof. Ken Haenen.

History

Establishment and start

UHasselt/LUC was official established by law in May 1971. In September 1973, the first academic year followed with around 320 students and six (undergraduate) programmes (Mathematics, Physics, Chemistry, Biology, Dentistry and Medicine).

Growth

In the ensuing decades, Hasselt University went through an enormous transformation. In 1991, the Limburg Business School (EHL) was transformed into the university's third faculty (Faculty of Applied Economics, presently Business Economics). The curriculum was expanded to include Transportation Sciences (2004), Law (2008), Architecture, Interior Architecture, Engineering Technology, Rehabilitation Sciences (2013) and Commercial Sciences (2015). In 2022, five additional programmes were launched: Social Sciences, Materiomics, Nursery and Midwifery, Healthcare Engineering and Engineering Technology: Computer Science.

Partnerships

In 2001, UHasselt/LUC and Maastricht University founded the Transnational University Limburg (tUL) – an international partnership involving two universities in two countries. tUL offers several programmes: Computer Science, Statistics, Biomedical Sciences and Law (a collaboration between tUL and KU Leuven). In 2003, UHasselt/LUC and university colleges PHL and XIOS (presently, PXL University College) formed the Limburg Association of Higher Education, or AUHL. The Association eyes the further development of higher education and scientific research in the Region.

In 2022, Hasselt University joined the EURECA-PRO European University Alliance. The network enables students and staff to study, teach and research in the field of responsible consumption and production. The long-term ambition of UHasselt and its partners in Austria, France, Germany, Greece, Poland, Romania and Spain, is to become the European hub for education and research in sustainability.

Name change

In 2005, LUC was renamed Hasselt University (or UHasselt).

From one to two campuses

In 2012, UHasselt opened a second campus in the city centre of Hasselt. It includes the Rectorate, the Law Faculty Building and the Old Prison (‘Oude Gevangenis’). The Old Prison is the university's main seat as well as the place where new students must register.

Rectors of Hasselt University
Rectorial elections at UHasselt take place every four years. All members of the faculty and school boards are eligible to vote (including student representatives). As highest decision-making body, the board of governors officially appoint the new rector. Over the past decades, Hasselt University has had four rectors (including current Rector Vanheusden):

 1972-1988: Louis Verhaegen
 1988-2004: Harry Martens
 2004-2020: Luc De Schepper
 2020–present: Bernard Vanheusden

Campuses and main buildings

Campus Diepenbeek 
Campus Diepenbeek (75 hectares) is located in the ‘green belt’ near Hasselt. The campus is home to several research institutes, incubators and spin-offs. The student restaurant, University Library, class rooms and auditoriums are located in Main Building D. Other notable campus buildings are the Science Tower (with laboratories for education and research in chemistry and physics) and the Application Centre for Concrete and Construction (ACB²).

Campus Hasselt 
Campus Hasselt (2 hectares) consists of the Rectorate (with the Rector's Office), the Faculty of Law and the Old Prison. The almost 200-year-old building has a restaurant, two auditoriums and former prison cells turned into study rooms. The Student Service Centre, where enrolment of new students takes place, is also located in the Old Prison Building.

Faculties, Schools and research institutes

Faculties and Schools 
UHasselt has seven Faculties and three Schools, offering 18 Bachelor and 34 Master programmes in total (including 5 English-taught programmes):

 Architecture and Arts
 Business Economics
 Engineering Technology
 Law
 Medicine and Life Sciences
 Rehabilitation Sciences
 Sciences
 School of Transportation Sciences
 School of Educational Studies
 School for Social Sciences

Research institutes and centres 
UHasselt has four research institutes covering the entire research spectre (from fundamental research to applied research to valorisation):

 Biomedical Research Institute (BIOMED)
 Centre for Environmental Sciences (CMK)
 Data Science Institute (DSI)
 Institute for Materials Research (imo-imomec)

There are also three research centres:

 Limburg Clinical Research Centre (LCRC)
 Transportation Research Institute (IMOB)
 Expertise Centre for Digital Media (EDM)

Student life

Student Council

Each academic year, UHasselt students elect a Student Council (StuRa), consisting of fourteen members from the different Faculties and Schools. These representatives take part in several decision-making bodies, including the Board of Governors and the Educational Council.

Student Associations 
UHasselt has a rich student life, with several Student Associations:

 Ambifaarke (student orchestra)
 ASG (Engineering Technology)
 BeMSA Hasselt (Belgian Medical Student Association)
 Biomedica (Biomedical Sciences)
 CCG (Christian Campus Community)
 Commeatus (Transportation Sciences) 
 DIP's (Chemistry and Biology)
 ELSA Hasselt (European Law Students’ Association Hasselt)
 ESN Hasselt (Erasmus Student Network)
 Filii Lamberti (Mathematics, Physics and Computer Science)
 Hermes (Economics)
 JOSS (Joint Organisation of Statistics Scholars)
 Junior Consulting (association fostering entrepreneurial skills)
 Miezerik (Medicine)
 Themis (Law)
 Rekinea (Rehabilitation Sciences)

Academic life

Opening academic year 
The formal opening of the academic year traditionally takes place in the penultimate week of September. The day starts with the Procession of Professors in the centre of Hasselt and a toast by the Mayor at City Hall. In the afternoon, a ceremony with speeches and music is held.

Foundation Day 

Hasselt University celebrates its Foundation Day on May 28 (the day when the university was established by law, in 1971). To mark the occasion, honorary doctorate degrees are awarded to individuals for outstanding contributions made to a specific field and/or to society in general. Each honorary doctor receives a diploma and the University Medal. Since 2022, UHasselt also hands out the Foundation Day Honorary Award to an organisation.

In the past decades, numerous internationally renowned scientists, artists, architects, journalists and entrepreneurs from around the world joined the circle of honorary doctors of Hasselt University:

 Anne Larigauderie
 Annemarie Mol
 Christian Grönroos
 Stella Nkomo
 Dirk De Wachter
 Te Gek!? (Foundation Day Honorary Award 2022)
 Jan Rabaey
 Dipak Kalra
 William Cleveland
 Jane Goodall
 Arne Akbar
 Franklin A. Tuitt
 Alarcos Cieza
 Patricia Moore
 Clarice Garcia Borges Demétrio
 Ronnie Leten
 Bruno Vanobbergen
 Thomas A. Louis
 John Goddard
 Serge Abiteboul
 Harry Timmermans
 Susanne Baer
 Ayodhya Tiwari
 Yehuda Shoenfeld
 Joëlle Tuerlinckx
 Jos Delbeke
Morten Bennedsen
Mariana Mazzucato
Stijn Bijnens
Martha Nussbaum
Jean-Marie Tarascon
Paul Stoffels
Kunlé Adeyemi
 John Lloyd Provis
 Emmanuel de Merode
 Richard D. Bardgett
 Jeremy Rifkin
 Thomas Friedman
 S. Tamer Cavusgil
 Christine Van Broeckhoven
 Bijoy Jain
 Luc Deleu
 Henry Chesbrough
 Lieven Maesschalck
 Michael Braungart
 Heinz Klug
 Richard Friend
 Jean-Jacques Cassiman
 John G. F. Cleland
 Silvana Sciarra
 Wil van der Aalst
 Ramesh Raskar
 Johny Vansevenant
 Mahmoud F. Fathalla
 Marc Bossuyt
 Monder Ram
 Bernardo Secchi
 Ignace Schops
 Andrew B. Holmes
 Richard E. Palmer
 Koen Vanmechelen
 Michael Rowe
 Panamarenko
 Robert Mendelsohn
 Michael Grätzel
 Susan Trumbore
 Alain Hubert
 Norman Breslow
 Ingrid Daubechies
 Piet Lemstra
 Lawrence Steinman
 Alan Thompson
 Baruch Lev
 Gerard Unger
 Shalom Hakkert
 Christopher Alexander
 Axelle Red
 Polly Matzinger
 Cees Dekker
 Kathleen Eisenhardt
 Frank De Winne
 Tom Jovin
 Yuri Gurevich
 David Montgomery
 Michael Berridge
 Harold Kroto
 Roger Langenaken
 David Cox
 Erwin Neher
 Hans Mohr
 Georges Köhler

See also
 Science and technology in Flanders
 Limburg Science Park
 University Foundation
 Flanders Interuniversity Institute of Biotechnology (VIB)
 Interuniversity Microelectronics Centre (IMEC)

References

External links 

 Hasselt University
 More information about higher education in Flanders/Belgium (in English)
 Find an officially recognised programme of this institution in the Higher Education Register

 

Educational institutions established in 1971
Universities in Belgium
Limburg (Belgium)
1971 establishments in Belgium
Buildings and structures in Limburg (Belgium)
Hasselt